Atmajyoti Ashram is a Hindu temple in Vadodara in Gujarat, India.

Vadodara
Hindu temples in Gujarat